The Ancient City, published in 1864, is the most famous book of the French historian Numa Denis Fustel de Coulanges (1830–1889). Taking inspiration from René Descartes, and based on texts of ancient historians and poets, the author investigates the origins of the most archaic institutions of Greek and Roman society.

In the preface of the book, he warns of the error that lies in examining the habits of ancient people with reference to those of today, when it is necessary to avoid our biases and study ancient peoples in the light of the facts.

Fustel de Coulanges sees religion and cult as the foundation of the institutions of the Greeks and Romans. Each family had their belief, their gods, and their worship. The rules of gender and family hierarchy, ownership, inheritance, etc., were governed by that cult. Over time, need has led men to regularize and make more consistent their relations with one another, and the rules that govern the family were transferred to increasingly larger units, arriving eventually at the city. Therefore, the origin of the city is also religious, as is witnessed by the practice of lustration, a periodic purification ceremony in connection with the census of all citizens, and by the public banquets in honor of local gods.

The laws originally encoded the privileges of the aristocracy, causing great discomfort to the plebs and a social revolution in which the common well-being of society became the new basis of religion. The city thus came into being for some time, until its extinction with the arrival of Christianity.

Translations 
The Ancient City: A Study on the Religion, Laws, and Institutions of Greece and Rome, Imperium Press, 2020. 
The Ancient City: A Study on the Religion, Laws, and Institutions of Greece and Rome, Johns Hopkins University Press, 1980.

Notes

External links 
 online version

1864 non-fiction books
19th-century history books
History books about ancient Greece
History books about ancient Rome
History books about cities
History books about religion